The Besat is an upcoming class of attack submarine under construction by Iran.

History 
On 25 August 2008, Iranian defence minister Mostafa Mohammad-Najjar announced Iran had started building the first submarine of the class named Qaaem, which will be capable of carrying and firing various types of torpedoes and undersea missiles.< Since 2012, Iranian officials have not mentioned Qaaem class and it is unclear whether it has been further developed, or has turned into Besat project.

See also

 List of naval ship classes of Iran
 List of military equipment manufactured in Iran

References

External links
 Profile at GlobalSecurity.org

Submarine classes of the Islamic Republic of Iran Navy
Military projects